Acacia guymeri is a shrub belonging to the genus Acacia and the subgenus Juliflorae that is native to north eastern Australia. It was listed as vulnerable according to the Environment Protection and Biodiversity Conservation Act 1999 but was delisted in 2013. It is still listed as Vulnerable according to the Nature Conservation Act 1992 in Queensland.

Description
It has silver to grey coloured bark that has a smooth texture. The resinous, slightly angular branchlets are a red-brown or yellow-red colour. Like most species of Acacia it has phyllodes rather than true leaves. The evergreen glabrous phyllodes have a linear shape and are straight to slightly curved. It blooms around January producing pale yellow or golden flowers. The yellow-brown seeds inside darken with age and are arranged longitudinally inside the pods.

Distribution

See also
List of Acacia species

References

guymeri
Flora of Queensland
Plants described in 1978